Juho Lehtonen, born 3 August 1992 in Rauma, Finland, is a Finnish footballer currently playing for FC Jazz. He has previously played for TPS and KTP in the Finnish premier division Veikkausliiga.

References 

1992 births
Living people
People from Rauma, Finland
Finnish footballers
Porin Palloilijat players
Turun Palloseura footballers
FC Haka players
FC Jazz players
Veikkausliiga players
Ykkönen players
Åbo IFK players
Kotkan Työväen Palloilijat players
Association football forwards
Sportspeople from Satakunta